Shoval is a kibbutz in southern Israel. Located in the northern Negev desert near the Bedouin city of Rahat, it falls under the jurisdiction of Bnei Shimon Regional Council.

Etymology
The kibbutz founders wanted to name it "Eilat" as they wanted to settle near the Red Sea, however, the naming committee chose the name Shoval.
The origin of the name is from two passages in the Books of Chronicles:
″The sons of Se'ir: Lotan, Shoval, Tziv'on, 'Anah, Dishon, Etzer and Dishan.″ - 1 Chronicles 1:38
″The descendants of Y'hudah: Peretz, Hetzron, Karmi, Hur and Shoval.″ - 1 Chronicles 4:1

History
The kibbutz was founded on 6 October 1946 as part of the 11 points operation by a gar'in whose members were of Hashomer Hatzair and immigrants who had survived the Patria disaster.

Economy
Shoval has two major sources of income; agriculture and plastics manufacturing. Its dairy farm is one of the largest in the area and is managed as a partnership with kibbutz Na'an. It also has a vast area of arable land where wheat, barley and potatoes are grown. In addition there are several chicken coops that are mainly used to raise chickens for meat. The kibbutz also operates a plastic seals manufacturing plant named Seal Jet.

Arava Power Company operates a solar farm on Shoval's land. This 24 acre farm can produce 6.4 MW using 22100 JA Solar panels.

Education
In 1963, a regional high school was built named Mevo'ot HaNegev in the kibbutz. The school serves pupils of the ages of 12–18 from the kibbutz and the surrounding settlements. The education system in the kibbutz also includes kindergartens and the young students learn in the Nitzanei HaNegev elementary school in Beit Kama. The kibbutz also hosts an ulpan for teaching the Hebrew language and its students study and work in the kibbutz.

Notable people

 Yehuda Bauer, historian
 Itzhak Bentov, Engineer, Scientist
 Elazar Granot, former member of the Knesset
 Yehudit Kafri, poet and author
 Danny Robas, musician

References

Kibbutzim
Kibbutz Movement
Populated places established in 1946
Populated places in Southern District (Israel)
1946 establishments in Mandatory Palestine